Plocoglottis is a genus of orchids (family Orchidaceae), native to Southeast Asia and to various islands from the Andaman Islands to the Solomons.

Species accepted as of June 2014:

Plocoglottis angulata J.J.Sm. - Borneo
Plocoglottis atroviridis Schltr. - New Guinea
Plocoglottis bicallosa Ames - Philippines
Plocoglottis bicomata L.O.Williams - Luzon
Plocoglottis bokorensis (Gagnep.) Seidenf. - Cambodia, Thailand, Vietnam
Plocoglottis borneensis Ridl. - Borneo
Plocoglottis confertiflora J.J.Sm. - New Guinea
Plocoglottis copelandii Ames - Philippines
Plocoglottis dilatata Blume - Borneo, Java
Plocoglottis gigantea (Hook.f.) J.J.Sm. - Thailand, Malaysia, Borneo, Sumatra
Plocoglottis glaucescens Schltr. - New Guinea
Plocoglottis hirta Ridl. - Borneo
Plocoglottis janowskii J.J.Sm. - New Guinea
Plocoglottis javanica Blume - Nicobar Islands, Thailand, Vietnam, Borneo, Java, Malaysia, Sumatra 
Plocoglottis kaniensis Schltr. - New Guinea, Solomons, Bismarcks
Plocoglottis lacuum J.J.Sm. - New Guinea
Plocoglottis lancifolia J.J.Sm. - New Guinea
Plocoglottis latifrons J.J.Sm. - New Guinea, Solomons
Plocoglottis lobulata Schltr. - Sulawesi
Plocoglottis loheriana (Kraenzl.) Goebel - Philippines
Plocoglottis longicuspis J.J.Sm. - New Guinea
Plocoglottis lowii Rchb.f. - Andaman Islands, Thailand, Borneo, Java, Malaysia, Sumatra, Maluku, New Guinea
Plocoglottis lucbanensis Ames - Philippines
Plocoglottis maculata Schltr.  - New Guinea
Plocoglottis mamberamensis J.J.Sm.  - New Guinea
Plocoglottis mindorensis Ames - Philippines
Plocoglottis moluccana Blume - Maluku, New Guinea
Plocoglottis neohibernica Schltr. in K.M.Schumann & C.A.G.Lauterbach - Bismarcks
Plocoglottis parviflora Ridl. - Sarawak
Plocoglottis plicata (Roxb.) Ormerod - Borneo, Sumatra, Java, Maluku, Sulawesi, Philippines 
Plocoglottis pseudomoluccana Schltr.  - New Guinea
Plocoglottis pubiflora Schltr. in K.M.Schumann & C.A.G.Lauterbach - New Guinea
Plocoglottis quadrifolia J.J.Sm. - Thailand, Malaysia, Sumatra
Plocoglottis sakiensis Schltr.  - New Guinea
Plocoglottis seranica J.J.Sm. - Seram
Plocoglottis sororia J.J.Sm.  - New Guinea
Plocoglottis sphingoides J.J.Sm.  - New Guinea
Plocoglottis striata J.J.Sm.  - New Guinea
Plocoglottis torana J.J.Sm. - New Guinea, Solomons
Plocoglottis torricellensis Schltr.  - New Guinea
Plocoglottis tropidiifolia J.J.Sm. - New Guinea

References

Collabieae
Collabieae genera